Hariraj Kunwar was an Indian politician from the state of the Madhya Pradesh.
He represented Kotma Vidhan Sabha constituency in the Madhya Pradesh Legislative Assembly by winning the seat in the General election of 1957.

References 

Year of birth missing
Possibly living people
People from Madhya Pradesh
Madhya Pradesh MLAs 1957–1962
People from Kotma
Indian National Congress politicians from Madhya Pradesh